Anita Valen (born 12 December 1968) is a Norwegian cyclist. She won the Norwegian National Road Race Championship six times.

She was born in Porsgrunn, and is the sister of Monica Valvik.

She competed at the 2004 Summer Olympics, and again at the 2008 Summer Olympics. She won a bronze medal at the 2004 UCI Road World Championships.

See also
2007 Vrienden van het Platteland season
2008 Team Flexpoint season

References

External links

1968 births
Living people
Sportspeople from Porsgrunn
Norwegian female cyclists
Olympic cyclists of Norway
Cyclists at the 2004 Summer Olympics
Cyclists at the 2008 Summer Olympics
21st-century Norwegian women